Enneapterygius cheni is a species of threefin blenny in the genus Enneapterygius. It was described by S.C. Wang, K.T. Shao, and S.C. Shen in 1996. It is a subtropical blenny found in the northwestern Pacific Ocean, and swims at depths ranging from 0–12 metres. It has been described from Taiwan and the Ryukyu Islands. Male E. cheni can reach a maximum length of 2.4 centimetres. The specific name honours the person who collected the type, Jeng-Ping Chen of the Taiwan Ocean Research Institute.

References

External links
 Enneapterygius cheni at www.fishwise.co.za.
 Enneapterygius cheni at World Register of Marine Species

cheni
Taxa named by Wang Shen-Chih
Taxa named by Shao Kwang-Tsao
Taxa named by Shen Shih-Chieh
Fish described in 1996
Fish of Taiwan